The Pretzel Belt, or Pennsylvania Snack Belt, is a concentration of pretzel and snack food makers in the central southeastern region of Pennsylvania, roughly coterminous with Pennsylvania Dutch Country. The first commercial pretzel manufacturer in the United States, the Julius Sturgis Pretzel Bakery, was founded in the region in the borough of Lititz in 1861, and remains extant there today. By the beginning of the 20th century the pretzel had become a cultural institution in the region. Manufacturers also include several pretzel and chip bakeries in Hanover, Pennsylvania, which holds the nickname "the snack capital of the world", as well as other examples like Hershey, Pennsylvania, home of the Hershey Chocolate Company.

Pennsylvania in general produces 80% of the pretzels consumed in the United States, with many of the top producers located in York County alone.

The term "Pretzel Belt" has also been used in a similar context to describe an area of the mid-Atlantic where pretzel consumption is higher than most American states.

References

External links
 Pennsylvania's Snack Food Scene, Pennsylvania Dept. of Community and Economic Development
 Snackin' - Pennsylvania Style!, Pennsylvania Heritage magazine

Belt
Belt regions of the United States
Cultural regions of the United States
Economy of the Northeastern United States
Regions of Pennsylvania